Neil Lynch may refer to:

Neil Lynch (politician) (born 1934), Montana politician
Neil L. Lynch (1930–2014), Justice of the Massachusetts Supreme Judicial Court 
Neil Lynch, rugby player, see 2002–03 Ystalyfera RFC season
Neil Lynch, member of the band, Moler

See also
Niall Lynch (disambiguation)